{{DISPLAYTITLE:C21H26N2O}}
The molecular formula C21H26N2O (molar mass: 322.452 g/mol, exact mass: 322.2045 u) may refer to:

 Acetylfentanyl
 Benzylfentanyl (R-4129)

Molecular formulas